A native of Florence, South Carolina, Travis Hunter is the author of seven novels of urban fiction. As an author, songwriter, motivational speaker and father, Travis self-published his first novel, The Hearts of Men, in 2000 through his own company, Jimrose Publishing House. After shopping that book during the 2000 Book Expo America in Chicago, Hunter received an offer from Random House, Inc. The Hearts of Men was re-released through their Strivers Row/Villard division in May 2001. Since then, Hunter has received great success with six more novels; Married But Still Looking, Trouble Man, A One Woman Man, Something to Die For, A Family Sin and his latest release, Dark Child.

Having been raised in Philadelphia, Pa. Hunter is "a veteran of the U.S. Army, he attended Clark Atlanta University and subsequently enrolled in Georgia State University where he majored in Psychology."

Hunter and his son, RaShaad, currently resides outside of Atlanta, Georgia. As the founder of the "Hearts of Men Foundation" he mentors underprivileged children. Hunter is also currently an active board member of "Brother 2 Brother Literary Symposium".

Works 
I’m a Victim, Just Ask Me (June 2000)
The Hearts of Men (May 2001, Random House)
Married But Still Looking (June 2003, Random House)
Troubled Man(August 2003, Villard)
A One Woman Man (June 2004, One World/Ballantine Books)
Something to Die For (October 2006, One World/Ballantine Books)
A Family Sin (September 2007, One World/Ballantine Books)
Dark Child: A Novel Presented by Zane (erotica author) (June 2009, Stebor Publishing)
 Momma's a Virgin (September 27, 2011 [Strebor Publishing])
Married but Not Really (2018, Jimrose Publishing)

Awards
2003 Author of Year, voted by readers of Atlanta Daily World

References

External links 
 Travis Hunter homepage
 Travis Hunter Myspace Page

African-American writers
American writers
Songwriters from South Carolina
Living people
Year of birth missing (living people)
21st-century African-American people